Antaeotricha sortifera is a moth in the family Depressariidae. It was described by Edward Meyrick in 1930. It is found in Bolivia.

The wingspan is about 22 mm. The forewings are whitish-ochreous closely irrorated light fuscous, the veins posteriorly partly indicated finely with white and with the costal edge white, edged finely beneath with fuscous from near the base to beyond the middle. Beneath this is an elongate blotch of white suffusion from the base to two-fifths, with a slight suffused dark fuscous mark beneath the costa at one-sixth. Beneath this is a black supramedian streak from the base to one-third, edged light greyish-ferruginous above. There is some slight fuscous suffusion on the dorsum near the base and there are two very oblique irregular incomplete dentate lines of dark fuscous suffusion, the first from a black streak before the extremity to the middle of the dorsum, the second from before the middle of the costa slightly curved to near the dorsum towards the tornus, then abruptly indented and ending on the dorsum about three-fourths, the second discal stigma forming a blackish dot on the middle of this. There is also a faint whitish curved irregular shade from two-thirds of the costa near the margins to the tornus and a marginal series of dark fuscous linear marks edged anteriorly whitish around the posterior third of the costa and termen.

References

Moths described in 1930
sortifera
Moths of South America